The Bournillon cave (French: grotte de Bournillon) is located in the commune of Châtelus in the Isère Department of France, in the Vercors Massif.

Description

The main passage may be followed for over a kilometre to the Salle Terminale. Two short passages lead off from here, both terminating in sumps, where the passage disappears underwater. A passage in the west wall of the entrance porch joins the main passage via a ledge after some 600 metres.

After four or five months of draught the sump in the right-hand passage leading off from the Salle Terminale drains, allowing access to further passages upstream. This section is dangerous in the event of storms. The Salle des Centaures, a chamber , is followed by a bedding passage leading to another gallery: Minos Centre.

Exploration history
In 1897 a team led by French caver Oscar Decombaz (1866 - 1914) explored the grotto as far as the Metro Needle where the galley becomes a siphon. In 1942 André Bourgin and Roger Pénelon found the upper gallery and the lateral gallery. Attempts to dive at the Metro Needle siphon did not achieve significant upstream penetration. An exceptional drought in 1985 allowed Maurice and Franck Chiron to discover  of new galleries, terminating a point   higher than the cave entrance, at the two siphons Alpha and Beta. David Bianzani and other cave divers probed the siphons, but further upstream exploration remains.

Hydrology

Lower in the Bournillon Gorge is the Sources de Arbois, which is the normal resurgence for the catchment area, which constitutes much of southern Vercors: the high plateau of Vercors and the Vassieux High Plateaux. The stream from the Bournillon flows into the Bourne, which is a tributary of the Isère river, and from thence to the Rhône.

Geology
The cave developed at the base of the Urgonian limestone formation. Dating one of the stalagmites indicated that the speleothem had been formed more than 350,000 years ago.

References

Caves of France